Daniel Häfeli (born 1 August 1960) is a retired Swiss football defender.

References

1960 births
Living people
Swiss men's footballers
FC Winterthur players
FC Lugano players
Swiss Super League players
Association football defenders